Bereg is a rural locality (a village) in Chushevitskoye Rural Settlement, Verkhovazhsky District, Vologda Oblast, Russia. The population was 47 as of 2002.

Geography 
Bereg is located 44 km southwest of Verkhovazhye (the district's administrative centre) by road. Chushevitsy is the nearest rural locality.

References 

Rural localities in Verkhovazhsky District